FK Atlantas was a Lithuanian football team from the port city of Klaipėda. 

The club's name has changed several times. It was established in 1962 as Granitas, and became PSK Aras in 1993. Since 1996, when FK Sirijus Klaipėda was absorbed into the club, it has had the name Atlantas, which in Lithuanian language means Atlantic Ocean.

Atlantas were the SSR Lithuanian champions in 1978, 1980, 1981, and 1984.

History

Modern Atlantas was founded in 1996. In Soviet occupation period in Klaipėda City was team known as Granitas and Atlantas from 1970 was farm club of Granitas. Atlantas name was used in Lithuanian championship and Granitas in Soviet Union Championship. In Lithuanian independence period from 1990 Granitas and Atlantas tradition was lost, but in 1996 refounded team and named Atlantas. This team soon became a strongest football team in Klaipėda. Played in top division long time.

In summer 2018, the club had financial problems, because account's in banks were suspended. After that, some players ran away from the club. Club owners thought about all chances to save club from dissvolvement. In the first half of the 2018 A Lyga, the club was in 4th position and after the summer they didn't win any games in the championship and lost their position. But after 28 rounds, they were in 6th position and could play in final stage of the championship. 29th round was a lost to FC Stumbras 0–6.

In January 2019, about the club situation known, that they lost sponsorship from business and Klaipėda city municipality and that means, that the club soon can defunct.

In February 2019, the club changed owners. The new chief is Vidas Adomaitis.

On 5 December 2019, the Lithuanian Football Federation announce that two A Lyga clubs, FK Atlantas and FK Palanga have been excluded from the A Lyga due to manipulation of the match results, fined 30,000 euros and relegated to II Lyga. Five players were punished with fines and a ban from all football activity ranging from 6 to 12 months.

Atlantas was in 2020 Antra lyga (3rd level) and after first round was one of the top–6 teams. In final stage team had chances for the promotion to Pirma lyga.

Name history
1962 – Granitas Klaipėda
1970 – Atlantas Klaipėda
1996 – FK Atlantas Klaipėda

Honours

Domestic
Lithuanian Championship
Runners-up (3): 2001, 2002, 2013
Third place (5): 1999, 2000, 2004, 2014, 2015
Lithuanian Cup
Winners (2): 2001, 2003
Runners-up (2): 2004, 2014–15

Soviet Championship
Lithuanian SSR Championship
Champions (4): 1978, 1980, 1981, 1984
Soviet Second League
Winners (2): 1964, 1985
Lithuanian SSR Cup
Winners (4): 1977, 1981, 1983, 1986

Other tournaments 
Turkmenistan President's Cup
Third place (1): 2003

Stadium

Central Stadium of Klaipėda is a multi-purpose stadium in Klaipėda, Lithuania. It is currently used mostly for football matches by FK Atlantas competing in A Lyga. In the past the stadium had a capacity of 9,000 and now holds only 5,000.

Sometimes (in early spring or late autumn, or winter) plays in alternative stadium Klaipėdos miesto centrinio stadiono dirbtinės dangos aikštė. That is artificial pavement ground nearby Central Stadium.

Supporters
FK Atlantas supporters are called Vakarų Frontas.
FK Atlantas supporters maintain friendly relations with fans of Žalgiris Vilnius.

Crest and colours
The crest features a yellow seahorse with a football on the background. In the middle of the crest there is a white text saying Atlantas at the top and Klaipėda in smaller text under it. The logo contained some white.

Since the beginning, the club has used the colors yellow and blue on their kits.

Kit manufacturers

 2013–2016 Jako
 2017–2018 Puma
 2018–present Adidas

Season-by-season

 Lithuania
{|class="wikitable"
|-bgcolor="#efefef"
! Season
! Div.
! Pos.
! Pl.
! W
! D
! L
! Goals
! Top Scorer
!Cup
!colspan=2|Europe
|-
|align=center|1999
|align=center|1st
|align=center|3
|align=center|18
|align=center|9
|align=center|6
|align=center|3
|align=center|34–24
|align=center|
|align=center|
|align=center|
|align=left|
|-
|align=center|2000
|align=center|1st
|align=center|3
|align=center|36
|align=center|21
|align=center|4
|align=center|11
|align=center|70–45
|align=center|
|align=center|
|align=center|
|align=left|
|-
|align=center|2001
|align=center|1st
|align=center|2
|align=center|36
|align=center|19
|align=center|12
|align=center|5
|align=center|66–29
|align=center|
|align=center|
|align=center|
|align=left|
|-
|align=center|2002
|align=center|1st
|align=center|2
|align=center|32
|align=center|20
|align=center|7
|align=center|5
|align=center|58–23
|align=center|
|align=center|
|align=center|
|align=left|
|-
|align=center|2003
|align=center|1st
|align=center|5
|align=center|28
|align=center|9
|align=center|6
|align=center|13
|align=center|27–30
|align=center|
|align=center|
|align=center|
|align=left|
|-
|align=center|2004
|align=center|1st
|align=center|3
|align=center|28
|align=center|15
|align=center|5
|align=center|8
|align=center|36–29
|align=center|
|align=center|
|align=center|
|align=left|
|-
|align=center|2005
|align=center|1st
|align=center|7
|align=center|36
|align=center|11
|align=center|8
|align=center|17
|align=center|40–52
|align=center|
|align=center|
|align=center|
|align=left|
|-
|align=center|2006
|align=center|1st
|align=center|6
|align=center|36
|align=center|14
|align=center|10
|align=center|12
|align=center|46–41
|align=center|
|align=center|
|align=center|
|align=left|
|-
|align=center|2007
|align=center|1st
|align=center|6
|align=center|36
|align=center|13
|align=center|6
|align=center|17
|align=center|54–45
|align=center|
|align=center|
|align=center|
|align=left|
|-
|align=center|2008
|align=center|1st
|align=center|6
|align=center|28
|align=center|7
|align=center|7
|align=center|14
|align=center|31–44
|align=center|
|align=center|
|align=center|
|align=left|
|-
|align=center|2009
|align=center|3rd
|align=center|1
|align=center|20
|align=center|18
|align=center|2
|align=center|0
|align=center|101–11
|align=center|Gintas Podelis
|align=center|
|align=center|
|align=left|
|-
|align=center|2010
|align=center|2nd
|align=center|7
|align=center|27
|align=center|9
|align=center|6
|align=center|12
|align=center|35–33
|align=center|Žilvinas Kymantas
|align=center|
|align=center|
|align=left|
|-
|align=center|2011
|align=center|1st
|align=center|11
|align=center|33
|align=center|3
|align=center|2
|align=center|28
|align=center|28–121
|align=center|Karolis Laukžemis
|align=center|
|align=center|
|align=left|
|-
|align=center|2012
|align=center|1st
|align=center|8
|align=center|36
|align=center|7
|align=center|6
|align=center|23
|align=center|33–92
|align=center|Tino Lagator
|align=center|
|align=center|
|align=left|
|-
|align=center|2013
|align=center|1st
|align=center|2
|align=center|32
|align=center|22
|align=center|5
|align=center|5
|align=center|64–23
|align=center|Evaldas Razulis
|align=center|
|align=center|
|align=left|
|-
|align=center|2014
|align=center|1st
|align=center|3
|align=center|36
|align=center|19
|align=center|8
|align=center|9
|align=center|76–36
|align=center|Evaldas Razulis
|align=center|
|align=center|
|align=left|
|-
|align=center|2015
|align=center|1st
|align=center|3
|align=center|36
|align=center|21
|align=center|7
|align=center|8
|align=center|65–34
|align=center|Andrey Panyukov
|align=center|
|align=center|
|align=left|
|-
|align=center|2016
|align=center|1st
|align=center|4
|align=center|33
|align=center|16
|align=center|8
|align=center|9
|align=center|42–32
|align=center|Maksim Maksimov
|align=center|
|align=center|
|align=left|
|-
|align=center|2017
|align=center|1st
|align=center|5
|align=center|33
|align=center|8
|align=center|12
|align=center|13
|align=center|39–43
|align=center|Andrey Panyukov
|align=center|
|align=center|
|align=left|
|-
|align=center|2018
|align=center|1st
|align=center|6
|align=center|33
|align=center|6
|align=center|6
|align=center|21
|align=center|28–75
|align=center|
|align=center|
|align=center|
|align=left|
|-
|align=center|2019
|align=center|1st
|align=center|6
|align=center|33
|align=center|7
|align=center|5
|align=center|21
|align=center|30–78
|align=center|
|align=center|
|align=center|
|align=left| 
|}

Current squad

Notable and famous players
FK Atlantas players who have either appeared for their respective national team at any time or received an individual award while at the club.

Lithuania
 Robertas Poškus (1996–1997)
 Tomas Danilevičius (1995–1996)
 Raimondas Žutautas (1995)
 Darvydas Šernas
 Linas Pilibaitis
 Kęstutis Ivaškevičius
 Andrius Jokšas
 Rimantas Žvingilas
 Valdas Trakys
 Vladimiras Buzmakovas
 Darius Žutautas
 Audrius Kšanavičius
 Mindaugas Panka
 Edvinas Gertmonas

 Nerijus Barasa
 Tadas Labukas
 Arūnas Šuika
 Remigijus Pocius
 Vidas Alunderis
 Andrius Gedgaudas
 Rolandas Baravykas
 Ovidijus Verbickas
 Saulius Mikalajūnas
 Valdemaras Martinkėnas
 Audrius Žuta
 Viktoras Olšanskis
 Tomas Žiukas
 Vadimas Petrenko

Europe
 Adebayo Akinfenwa (2001–2002)
 Jalen Pokorn
 Andrei Panyukov
 Yuri Kirillov
 Dzmitry Mazalewski

South America
 Leandro da Silva

Africa
 Pascal Feindouno (2016)

Asia
 Minoru Takenaka (2000–2003)

European Cups history

Staff

Managers

 Algirdas Klimkevičius (19??–66)
 Algirdas Vosylius (1967–??)
 Romualdas Dambrauskas (19??–70)
 Henrikas Markevičius (1976–78)
 Fiodoras Finkelis (1978)
Vladas Ulinauskas (1980)
 Romas Lavrinavičius (1981)
 Algirdas Mitigaila (1982–83)
 Česlovas Urbonavičius (1984–86)
 Vytautas Gedgaudas (1986–89)
 Česlovas Urbonavičius (1984)
 Vytautas Gedgaudas (1992 – March 95)
 Algirdas Mitigaila (March 1995–00)
 Arūnas Šuika (2000)
 Vacys Lekevičius (2001–04)
 Šenderis Giršovičius (2002)
 Igoris Pankratjevas (2003–05)
 Vacys Lekevičius (2005)
 Igoris Pankratjevas (2006)
 Arminas Narbekovas (2006–07)
 Mindaugas Čepas (2008–09)
 Šenderis Giršovičius (2009–10)
 Saulius Mikalajūnas (23 Dec 2009 – 20 May 2010)
 Igoris Pankratjevas (2010)
 Vitalijus Stankevičius (2011)
 Romualdas Norkus (1 March 2012 – 30 June 2012)
 Sébastien Roques (July 2012 – Nov 2012)
 Konstantin Sarsania (1 Jan 2013 – 27 May 2017)
 Sergej Savchenkov (28 May 2017 – 13 June 2017)
 Rimantas Žvingilas (13 Jun 2017 – 23 July 2017)
 Igoris Pankratjevas (23 Jul 2017–end of 2017)
 Algimantas Briaunys (January 2018– 30 August 2018)
 Anatoli Shelest (September 2018 – November 2018)
 Viktors Dobrecovs (February 2019 – November 2019)
 Donatas Navikas (in November 2019; temporary)

References

External links
Official website

 
Defunct football clubs in Lithuania
Football clubs in Klaipėda
1962 establishments in Lithuania
Association football clubs established in 1962
Association football clubs disestablished in 2020
2020  disestablishments in Lithuania